Michael Jesse Battle (born 12 December 1963) is an Episcopal moral theologian known for his works on spirituality, reconciliation, and the thought of Desmond Tutu.

Biography 
Born in New Orleans, Battle received a B.A. in 1986 from Duke University, an M.Div. in 1989 from Princeton Theological Seminary, a S.T.M. in 1991 from Yale University, and a Ph.D. in 1995 in theology and ethics from Duke University.

In 1993, Battle was ordained a priest by Desmond Tutu in St. George's Cathedral, Cape Town. He worked as vicar at St. Titus Episcopal Church in Durham, NC, rector of Church of Our Savior in San Gabriel, California, and rector of St. Ambrose Episcopal Church, Raleigh, NC. In 2007, he was made provost of Cathedral Center of St. Paul, Los Angeles and Canon theologian of the Episcopal Diocese of Los Angeles.

Battle has held a number of academic posts, teaching spiritual theology, moral theology, and black church studies at Duke Divinity School and the University of the South (now known as Sewanee: The University of the South). He is currently Herbert Thompson Professor of Church and Society and Director of the Desmond Tutu Center at General Theological Seminary, New York.

Battle and his wife Raquel have three children, Sage, Bliss and Zion.

Works

See also 
 Ubuntu theology
 Reconciliation theology

References

External links 
 Official Website

1963 births
Living people
Duke University alumni
Yale Divinity School alumni
Princeton Theological Seminary alumni
Sewanee: The University of the South faculty
Duke Divinity School faculty
General Theological Seminary faculty
African-American Episcopalians
African-American theologians
World Christianity scholars
Virginia Theological Seminary faculty
21st-century African-American people
20th-century African-American people